Blackthorn Asylum is the eleventh album by dark ambient duo Nox Arcana. The musical theme is described as being "set in an abandoned sanitarium for the criminally insane where the doctors conducted horrible experiments on the inmates."  Nox Arcana once again pays homage to H.P. Lovecraft as they did with their second album Necronomicon, stating "We set Blackthorn Asylum in the 1930s and revisit the dark domain of H.P. Lovecraft. The plot builds upon Lovecraft’s short story "From Beyond" and adds some creepy new twists."  And, as with almost every other album this band has released, this album conceals a puzzle, along with a storyline that expounds upon Lovecraft's story.

Track listing
 "Legacy of Darkness" — 2:09
 "Blackthorn Asylum" — 3:12
 "Sanitarium Gates" — 3:06
 "Abandoned" — 2:54
 "Threshold of Madness" — 3:41
 "Tapestry of Decay" — 3:06
 "Hidden Horrors" — 2:32
 "When Darkness Falls" — 3:24
 "Shock Treatment" —  :55
 "Fractured Memories" — 2:27
 "Phantasmagoria" — 3:27
 "Creeper" — 2:12
 "Sanity Slipping" — 3:03
 "Dementia 13" — 3:23
 "Solitary Confinement" — 3:24
 "Frenzy" — 2:45
 "The Condemned" — 3:04
 "Spiders in the Attic" — 4:24
 "From Beyond" —  :47
 "Essence of Evil" — 2:55
 "Fade to Black"  — 3:45

References

External links
 Nox Arcana's official website
[ Blackthorn Asylum] at Allmusic

Nox Arcana albums
2009 albums
Halloween albums
Cthulhu Mythos music